Sindor is an urban locality (an urban-type settlement) in Knyazhpogostsky District of the Komi Republic, Russia. As of the 2010 Census, its population was 2,478.

Administrative and municipal status
Within the framework of administrative divisions, the urban-type settlement of Sindor, together with two rural localities, is incorporated within Knyazhpogostsky District as Sindor Urban-Type Settlement Administrative Territory (an administrative division of the district). As a municipal division, Sindor Urban-Type Settlement Administrative Territory is incorporated within Knyazhpogostsky Municipal District as Sindor Urban Settlement.

References

Notes

Sources

Urban-type settlements in the Komi Republic
